Bihar has been a major centre of learning and home to one of the oldest universities of India dating back to the fifth century and the tradition of learning which had its origin from ancient times was lost during the medieval period when it is believed that marauding armies of the invaders destroyed these centres of learning.

Bihar saw a revival during the later part of the British rule when they established a university at Patna along with other centres of high learning, namely, Science College, Patna, Prince of Wales Medical College (Now Patna Medical College and Hospital), and Bihar Engineering College (Now National Institute of Technology, Patna). This early lead was lost in the post-independence period when the politicians from Bihar lost out in the race of getting centers of education established in Bihar.National institutes of learning such as IIT, IIM and AIIMS, IISER, NISER have had a good representation from Bihar. A survey by Pratham rated the absorption of their teaching by the Bihar children better than those in other states. According to the government, out-of-school rate in the age group 6-14 was 6.3% in 2007, a big drop from 12.8 per cent in 2006.

After a series of reforms and steps taken by BSEB such as interviewing toppers before releasing results, the pass percentage has increased considerably. In 2020, 80.44% students who had appeared for class 12 BSEB examination were declared passed. Similarly, for class 10, the pass percentage for 2020 examination improved to 80.59%. To increase the pass percentage, the pattern of examination was also changed with MCQs playing a key role in this improvement.

History of Education 
Historically, Bihar has been a major centre of learning, home to the ancient universities of Nalanda (est. 450 CE), Odantapurā (est. 550 CE) and Vikramashila (est. 783 CE). Nalanda and Vikramshila universities were destroyed by Islamic invader Bakhtiyar Khilji in 1200 CE.

Bihar saw a revival of its education system during the later part of the British rule, when Patna University, the seventh oldest university of the Indian subcontinent, was established in 1917. Some other centres of high learning established under British rule are Patna College (est. 1839), Bihar School of Engineering (est. 1900; now known as National Institute of Technology, Patna), Prince of Wales Medical College (est. 1925; now Patna Medical College and Hospital), Science College, Patna (est. 1928), Patna Women's College, Bihar Veterinary College (est. 1927), and Imperial Agriculture Research Institute (est. 1905; now Dr. Rajendra Prasad Central Agriculture University, Pusa). The  Patna University, one of the oldest universities in Bihar, was established in 1917, and is the 7th oldest university of the Indian subcontinent. Second oldest engineering college of India known as NIT Patna was established as survey training school in 1886 and later renamed as Bihar College of Engineering in 1932. Subsequently, Indian government upgraded Bihar College of Engineering to National Institute of Technology (NIT) status in 2004 and  granted Institute of National Importance status in 2007 in accordance with the National Institutes of Technology Act, 2007.

Bihar was one of the key educational hub of east India before independence. In the 1960s major educational reforms were implemented to streamline the education structure of state by the then education minister and educationist late Satender Narain Sinha; however the phenomenal changes were short-lived as the successive governments failed to implement it. In 1964 Bihar School of Yoga was established at Munger.  Bihar has an inadequate educational infrastructure creating a huge mismatch between demand and supply. This problem is further compounded by increases in population and governance issue specially during Lalu-Rabri era but revived after Nitish kumar became Chief minister. Improved governance has led to an economic revival in the state through increased investment in infrastructure, better health care facilities, greater emphasis on education, and a reduction in crime and corruption. The craving for higher education among the general population of Bihar has led to a migration of the student community from the state. This has led to a "flooding"  of students to seek educational opportunities in other states, such as New Delhi and Karnataka, even for graduation level college education. Researchers found out that 37.8% of Bihar's teachers could not be found during unannounced visits to schools, the worst teacher absence rate in India and one of the worst in the world. In spite of the inadequate investment on education in Bihar, compared to other poorer Indian states, the students have done well.

Literacy 

Bihar has a total literacy rate of 69.83%. Overall Male and Female literacy rate is 70.32% and 53.57% respectively. Total Rural literacy rate is 43.9%. In rural areas of Bihar, Male and Female literacy rate is 57.1 and 29.6 respectively. Total Urban literacy rate is 71.9. In urban areas of Bihar, Male and Female literacy rate is 79.9 and 62.6 respectively. . Total number of literates in Bihar is 3,16,75,607 which consists 2,09,78,955 Male and 1,06,96,652 Female. Patna has highest Literacy Rate of 63.82% followed by Rohtas (62.36%) and Munger (60.11%). Kishanganj has lowest Literacy Rate of 31.02% followed by Araria (34.94%) and Katihar (35.29%). A recent survey by Pratham rated the receptivity of Bihari children to their teaching as being better than those in other states. Bihar is striving to increase female literacy, now at 53.3%. At the time of independence, women's literacy in Bihar was 4.22%.

Primary and Secondary Education

From the British times, Bihar has had a system of district schools (called Zila schools), located at of the older districts of Bihar. In addition, there were private and semi aided schools which were run and administered by local village communities. Several of them were known for their high quality education.

During the late 1970s and early 1980s, the state government took over management of most privately run schools. This adversely affected school education in the state since the state government was ill-equipped to manage the schools through its bureaucrats who were trained for law and order duties. Though the state accorded them government recognition, the standard started to fall. The state did not take over the schools run by the Christian missionaries and these schools provided a fillip (boost) to quality education in Bihar.

As in other states, the central government runs a number of Kendriya Vidyalayas (Central Schools) and Jawahar Navodaya Vidyalaya for rural students. Jawahar Navodaya Vidyalaya started by the late Prime Minister Rajiv Gandhi have been successful in providing quality education to the weaker sections of the society.

With the efforts of politician Nitish Kumar Simultala Awasiya Vidyalaya was setup in 2010. The school has a distinction of producing toppers of the Bihar School Examination Board.

The number of private schools, including school-chains and Missionary Schools run by Christian Missionaries as well as Madrasas, or schools run by Muslim clerics, has increased in the post liberalisation era.

Most of the schools in Bihar are affiliated with the Bihar School Examination Board, while the Kendriya Vidyalaya and a few other elite schools including the Christian Missionary Schools are affiliated to the  CBSE board. A recent survey by National University of Educational Planning & Administration (NUEPA) has determined that only 21% of all primary school teachers in Bihar have completed the matriculation; or 10th standard. However, Bihar Government has recently implemented a series of reforms in its Primary Education Sector which includes mandatory digitization of all state-run schools.

Higher education

Bihar is home of 7 Institutes of National Importance which includes IIT Patna, IIM Bodh Gaya, AIIMS, Patna, NIT Patna, IIIT Bhagalpur, NIPER Hajipur and Nalanda University. In 2008, Indian Institutes of Technology Patna was inaugurated with students from all over India and same year National Institute of Fashion Technology Patna was established as the ninth such institute in India.  The Indian Institute of Management Bodh Gaya was established in 2015. In March 2019, the government of Bihar has sent a proposal to centre Government to upgrade Darbhanga Medical College and Hospital into an AIIMS-like institution.

Bihar is home of four Central universities which includes Central University of South Bihar, Mahatma Gandhi Central University, Dr. Rajendra Prasad Central Agriculture University and Nalanda University. In 2015, the central government had proposed re-establishment of Vikramshila in Bhagalpur and had designated 500 crores (5 billion) for it.  Bihar also has institutes such as National Institute of Fashion Technology Patna, National Law University, Patna  Institute of Hotel Management (IHM), Footwear Design and Development Institute, Bihta and  Central Institute of Plastic Engineering & Technology (CIPET) Center.  CIPET (and IHM was established in Hajipur in 1994 and 1998 respectively.

Aryabhatta Knowledge University was established under Aryabhatta Knowledge University Act, 2008 of  Bihar Government with purpose of the development and management of educational infrastructure related to technical education, medical, management and allied professional education in Bihar. Birla Institute of Technology, Patna was established in 2006. In 2008, Indian Institutes of Technology Patna was inaugurated with students from all over India In 2008, NSIT opened its new college in Bihta, which is now emerging as an education hub. Chanakya National Law University and Chandragupt Institute of Management were established in the later half of 2008 and  now attracts students from not just within Bihar but also students from far flung states. Nalanda International University is established in 2014 with active investment from countries such as Japan, Korea, and China.  The A.N. Sinha Institute of Social Studies is a premier research institute in the state.

Bihar has eight medical colleges which are funded by the government, namely Patna Medical College and Hospital, Nalanda Medical College and Hospital, Vardhman Institute of Medical Sciences, Indira Gandhi Institute of Medical Sciences, Darbhanga Medical College and Hospital, Anugrah Narayan Magadh Medical College and Hospital Gaya, Sri Krishna Medical College and Hospital, Jawaharlal Nehru Medical College, Bhagalpur, Government Medical College, Bettiah and five private medical colleges  In 2014 the government of Bihar established Development Management Institute in Bihta near the Patna. In February 2019, deputy chief minister Sushil Modi announced the Bihar government's planned to establish 11 new medical colleges at Chhapra, Purnia, Samastipur, Bengusarai, Sitamarhi, Vaishali, Jhanjharpur, Siwan, Buxar, Bhojpur, Jamui and a dental college at Rahui in Nalanda district is under construction. There are also plans on constructing a cancer institute within Indira Gandhi Institute of Medical Sciences premises and transformation of Patna Medical College and Hospital into a world-class health centre.

Bihar Government runs several state-level general-purpose universities such as Bhupendra Narayan Mandal University, B. R. Ambedkar Bihar University , Jai Prakash University, Lalit Narayan Mithila University, Magadh University, Patna University, Tilka Manjhi Bhagalpur University, Veer Kunwar Singh University, Patliputra University, Purnea University, and Munger University. Nalanda Open university was established in March 1987 by Government of Bihar to impart education exclusively through distance education and later in 1995, Nalanda Open University Act was passed by the legislature of Bihar and thereafter came under the authority and jurisdiction of the passed act. Bihar has specialized universities Bihar Agricultural University and Bihar Animal Sciences University to promote use  of technology in agriculture and animal husbandry.  Bihar Animal Sciences University  has three constituent colleges namely, Bihar Veterinary College, Sanjay Gandhi Institute of Dairy Technology (Patna) and College of Fisheries, Kishanganj. Bihar has two language-specific university Arabic and Persian University and Darbhanga Sanskrit University.

With institute like Super 30, Patna has emerged as a major center for engineering and civil services coaching. The major private IIT-JEE coaching institutes have opened up their branches in Bihar and this has reduced the number of students who go to, for example, Kota and Delhi for engineering/medical coaching.

Employability 
Bihar e-Governance Services & Technologies (BeST) and the government of Bihar have initiated a unique program to establish a centre of excellence called Bihar Knowledge Center, a finishing school to equip students with the latest skills and customised short-term training programs at an affordable cost. The centre aims to attract the youth of the state to improve their technical, professional, and soft skills, to meet the current requirements of the industrial job market. The National Employability Report of Engineering Graduates, 2014, puts graduates from Bihar in the top 25 percent of the country, and rates Bihar as one of the three top states at producing engineering graduates in terms of quality and employability.

See also 
Ministry of Education (Bihar)

References

See also
 List of educational institutions in Bihar
 List of educational institutions in Patna
 List of schools in Patna